Rugby union in the Congo can refer to either:

 Rugby union in the Democratic Republic of the Congo
 Rugby union in the Republic of the Congo